The Women's Individual Standing was an archery competition in the 1996 Summer Paralympics.

The gold medal was won by Malgorzata Olejnik, wife of the men's champion Ryszard Olejnik. In the final she defeated Anita Chapman.

The bronze medal match was won by Marie-Francoise Hybois of France.

Results

Qualifying round

Finals

References

Women's individual standing
1996 in women's archery